Brahmanbaria Government College is an educational institute of Brahmanbaria. The college is 200 yards east from Brahmanbaria Railway Station. This college is affiliated to National University, Bangladesh.

Founding background
In the 1939, the British troops took Feni College when it was started World War II. Then for some years Feni College was temporarily transferred from Feni to Brahmanbaria. At the end of the war, the college again went back to Feni. Brahmanbaria Government College was founded in 1948 on the infrastructure that Feni College left behind.

Brahmanbaria College was privately run in the initiative of the people of the area and in 1979 the college was nationalized. In the initial stage, the Higher Secondary and Bachelor Pass courses were introduced in the college. Honors courses are started in mathematics and political science from the 1993–94 academic year. Gradually, honors, master's courses were introduced in more than 12 subjects in the college।

Infrastructure

Faculty and issues 
 Bachelor (Honors) Course: 15 topics
 Postgraduate Courses: Political Science and Mathematics
 Master's Preliminary Course: Political Science

 Faculty of Arts: Bengali, English, Philosophy, History, Islamic Studies, History and Culture of Islam
 Faculty of Social Sciences: Political Science, Economics and Sociology
 Faculty of Science: Physics, Chemistry, Mathematics, Botany and Zoology
 Faculty of Business Faculty: Accounting, Management.

College buildings 
 Eight academic buildings
 An administrative building
 Three hostels
 A mosque
 A teacher's auditorium
 Two student hostels
 A teachers' dormitory

References

External links
 Official website of Brahmanbaria Government College

Colleges in Brahmanbaria District
Brahmanbaria District
Educational institutions established in 1948
1948 establishments in East Pakistan